WYNF (1340 AM) is a radio station licensed to Augusta, Georgia, United States. The station is owned by iHeartMedia, and serves as Augusta's affiliate for the Black Information Network.  Its studios are located at the Augusta Corporate Center near the I-20/I-520 interchange in Augusta, and the transmitter tower is west of Paine College in Augusta.

Up until September 2010, this station, as WSGF, carried a gospel format as "Hallelujah 1340". In September 2010, WYNF and its sports format moved to 1340; the call sign and format were previously on 1380, which was sold off and later became WNRR.

On June 29, 2020, fifteen iHeartMedia stations in markets with large African American populations, including WYNF, began stunting with African American speeches, interspersed with messages such as "Our Voices Will Be Heard" and "Our side of the story is about to be told," with a new format slated to launch on June 30. That day, WYNF, along with the other fourteen stations, became the launch stations for the Black Information Network, an African American-oriented all-news network. Prior to the change, WYNF was a Fox Sports Radio affiliate.

See also

Media in Augusta, Georgia

References

External links

YNF
IHeartMedia radio stations
Radio stations established in 1947
1947 establishments in Georgia (U.S. state)
Black Information Network stations
All-news radio stations in the United States